Joseph Attieh (born May 14, 1987) is a Lebanese singer who won the third season of Star Academy Lebanon in 2005. He is known for his song "Lebnan rah Yerjaa".

Career
Joseph became the first Lebanese artist to win the TV show Star Academy, in 2005. In 2006, he released his first single entitled "La Trouhy" (don't go) and filmed it as music video. The song became a best seller in Lebanon and the Middle East.

His second single "Nahle" (the bee), was released in 2007. Joseph released his third single "Habeit Oyounak" (I love your eyes) which he sang during the finals of the fifth edition final of Star Academy and this was his second music video.

In April 2008, he released a patriotic song, his biggest hit "El Haq Ma Beymout" or "Lebnan Rah Yerjaa" and won the first Murex d'Or award in 2009 for this song as best patriotic song of the year. And after a single titled "Law Gharrabouha" he released his first Egyptian song "Lina Rab" as theme song for an Egyptian movie.

In February 2010, Joseph released his first album "Mawhoum" produced by Star System, the album included 7 new hits: "Habibi El Gharam", "Teeb El Shouq", "Temthal", "Fiky", "Lamma El Kelma", "Ghayeb Habib El Rouh" and "Mawhoum". Among these songs, he filmed "Mawhoum", "Teeb El Shouq", and "Habibi El Gharam" as video clips which he directed himself.

At the end of 2010 he released 2 singles and music videos, a wedding song "Kel El Den" and "Bawastik". And he was nominated for the "MTV music award" for the best Arab youth male artist.

In August 2012, he launched his second album "Chou Btaemel Bel Nass" produced by Star System in a big concert in Beirut containing 9 new hits: "Chou Btaemel Bel Nass", "Sodfi Gharibe", "Al Wared", "Aallama", "Kelma Bshoufik", "Wajaa El Zekrayat", "Rayhin Ala Betna", "Fare El Omor" and "Ma Bhab".

In June 2013 he won the second Murex d'Or award for the best album "Chou Btaemel Bel Nass".

In March 2015, Joseph released his third album “Hobb W Mkattar” which includes: “Min Jdid”, “Eiwiha”, “La Tkhallini”, “Kel Ma El Masa Bi Tol”, “Damaato”, “Kilme Elak”, “Ya Kezabi”, “Weilak”, “Akbar Mennon Kellon”, “Helwa”.

In November 2017, Joseph released his fourth album JA4"al aghani li amelta elik “: “tghayyari” “ghalta tani “ “ma bestaghni” “al oula “ “shimali” “shou helwi” “Aw’at” “entaha mawdo’na” “enti Al layali” “ella enta” “rouh” “yey” “manno jereh” “ella enta - piano version “

On 13 August 2018, he released his sixth amazing single “omer aasal”.

In 2020 he released "khatt ahmar" "hafzek 3an ghayeb" and "nass bwab".

In 2021 he released "Tabii" and later released "yenaad alayk".

In 2022 he released his fifth album "Mnehkom aal nas". Joseph also released a TV series song "Aal helwe wel morra".

Awards
 Murex d'Or 2008 for the Best Song (الحق ما بموت)
 Music celebrity Award for the Best Singer
 Nomination for MTV Europe Award 2010
 Murex d'Or 2013 award for the Best Album "Chou Btaemel Bel Nass".

Discography

Songs of Joseph Attieh
1st album: Mawhoum (12 songs)
2nd album: Shou Btaamel Bel Nass (11 songs)
3rd album: Hobb W Mkattar (10 songs)
4th album: Tghayyari (14 songs)
Singles: 12 songs

Mawhoum: La Trouhy, Law Gharrabouha, Mawhoum, Habibi El Gharam, Teeb El Shouq, Temthal, Fiky, Lamma El Kelma, Ghayeb Habib El Rouh, Mawhoum (Remix), Habeit Eiounak, El Haq Ma Beymout.

Shou Btaamel Bel Nass: Shou Btaamel Bel Nass, Sodfe Gharibe, El Ward, Aalama, Kelma Bchofak, Wagaa El Zekrayat, Rayheen Beitna, Farek El Omor, Ma Bahab, Ya Kel El Deni, Bawastik.

Hobb W Mkattar: Hobb W Mkattar, Men Jidid, Ewiha, La Tkhalini, Kel Ma Lmasa Btol, Damaatou, Kelmi Ilik, Ya Kezzabi, Akbar Menon Kellon, Weilak (Acoustic).

Tghayyari: Tghayyari, Ghalta Tani, Ma Bestaghni, Al Oula, Shimali, Shou Helwi, Aw'at, Entaha Mawdo'na, Enti Al Layali, Ella Enta, Rouh, Yey, Manno Jereh, Ella Enta (Piano Version).

Singles: Lina Rab, La Trouhi, Weilak, Helwa, Akbar Menon Kelloun, Omer Aasal, Hdiyet Hobbak, Ghazala, Khat Ahmar,hafzek Aan ghayeb, Tabii, Yenaad alayk.

References

External links
 

1987 births
21st-century Lebanese male singers
Star Academy winners
Living people
Contestants from Arabic singing competitions